Jeannette Ng is a British fantasy writer best known for her 2017 novel Under the Pendulum Sun, for which she won the Sydney J Bounds Award for Best Newcomer at the 2018 British Fantasy Awards. For that work, she was also the winner of the 2019 John W. Campbell Award for Best New Writer, which, largely due to her acceptance speech, was shortly renamed thereafter to the Astounding Award for Best New Writer.

Life and education 
Ng was born in Hong Kong, and used her 2019 John W. Campbell Award for Best New Writer acceptance speech to pay tribute to the Hong Kong anti-extradition bill protestors.

She studied at Durham University, earning an M.A. in Medieval and Renaissance Studies. She lives in Durham, England. Ng is a nonbinary woman and uses she or they pronouns.

Career

Publications 

Ng's 2017 debut novel Under the Pendulum Sun (published by Angry Robot) concerns a fantastical journey in gothic mid-19th century England, and was shortlisted for Starburst's 2017 Brave New Words award and the 2018 Robert Holdstock Award for Best Fantasy Novel at the British Fantasy Awards. It was named by Syfy as one of the "10 Best Sci-Fi and Fantasy Books of 2017" and included in Adam Roberts' list of "The best science fiction and fantasy of 2017" in The Guardian and Jeff Somers' list of "50 of the Greatest Science Fiction & Fantasy Debut Novels Ever Written."

Ng won the Sydney J Bounds Award for Best Newcomer at the 2018 British Fantasy Awards for Under the Pendulum Sun, and was a 2018 finalist and 2019 winner of the John W. Campbell Award for Best New Writer, announced as part of the Hugo Awards.

Her story "How the Tree of Wishes Gained its Carapace of Plastic" is included in the anthology Not So Stories, published April 2018 by Abaddon Books, and was described by Starburst as "a tour de force of the author's talents." Other short stories have been published in Mythic Delirium and Shoreline of Infinity magazines.

John W. Campbell Award and acceptance speech 

In 2019, Ng won the John W. Campbell Award for Best New Writer, awarded during the Hugo Award ceremony at the 77th World Science Fiction Convention.

As part of her acceptance speech, she referred to the award's namesake John W. Campbell as "a fucking fascist", sparking debate in the science fiction and fantasy community.

On 27 August, the editor of award sponsors Analog Science Fiction and Fact announced that the award would be renamed the Astounding Award for Best New Writer.

In July 2020, Ng was awarded the Hugo Award for Best Related Work for her 2019 John W. Campbell Award acceptance speech. In her acceptance speech for this award (delivered by video due to the COVID-19 pandemic), she said that "pulling down memorials to dead racists is not the erasing of history, it is how we make history". She also said that "Last time I gave a speech at WorldCon, it was literally hours after a huge march in Hong Kong, my most cyberpunk of cities. Since then, things have gotten worse." "The tactics used to marginalise us, the tear gas used against us, it is the same everywhere. And we defeat it in the same way. And so our coming together is more important than ever before. To write a future of joy and hope and change." "Now is the time. Now is always the time. Free Hong Kong, Revolution of Our Time."

Bibliography

Novels

Short fiction

Essays 

 "Textile Arts Are Worldbuilding, Too" in Lost Transmissions: The Secret History of Science Fiction and Fantasy (2019), ed. Desirina Boskovich
 "As You Know, Bob...", in Uncanny Magazine (November-December 2019)
 "2019 John W. Campbell Award Acceptance Speech" (2020)
 "The History and Politics of Wuxia" in Tor.com (2019)
 "She Is Sword, and She Is Sorcery: Womanhood in The Witcher and The Wheel of Time" in Uncanny Magazine (July-August 2022)

Awards

References

External links 
 
 Author page at Angry Robot Books
 Maelstromic Insight: Thoughts and Theories on Game Design for Live Roleplay
 John W Campbell Award acceptance speech
 ISFDB

Living people
Hong Kong women
Hong Kong writers
Hong Kong novelists
Hong Kong LGBT novelists
Non-binary novelists
Writers of Gothic fiction
Women science fiction and fantasy writers
British fantasy writers
British women novelists
British women short story writers
21st-century British women writers
21st-century British novelists
21st-century British short story writers
Alumni of Grey College, Durham
Year of birth missing (living people)
Hugo Award-winning writers
John W. Campbell Award for Best New Writer winners